The Hockey Club Varese is an ice hockey team from Varese, Italy. It was created on 1977 under the name A.S. Mastini Varese Hockey. In 2005 (June) the club folded, but it continued to play in the Under 19 series under the name Hockey Club Varese, a new team founded in August 2005. In 2008 the club reintegrated the professional championship (Serie A2). In 2017 Killer Bees and Mastini Varese, the two Varese's non-professional teams, associated to create a new identity named Hockey Club Varese Bandits. In 2018, HC Varese 1977 s.c.s.d. came back to the Mastini naming.

Roster 2016/17 
<div style="font-size:90%">

Goaltender
  29 Davide Bertin
  33 Marco Menguzzato

Defenceman
  34 Francesco Borghi
  26 Mauro Andrea Grisi
  14 Nicola Barban
  37 Daniel Nicholas Belloni
  22 Erik Steve Mazzacane
  25 Dario Richard Cortenova 
  11 Edoardo Papalillo
  8  Matteo Cesarini

Forward
  17 Marco Andreoni    "A"
  32 Pietro Borghi
  75 Daniele Di Vincenzo
  12 Marco Franchini
  4  Dominik Perna
  88 Riccardo Privitera 
  27 Salvatore Sorrenti    
  91 Edoardo Raimondi     "C"
  16 Andrea Vanetti
  10 Michael Mazzacane    
  71 Benedetto Pirro
  97 Daniele Odoni
  19 Tommaso Teruggia
     Bettiati

Head coach
  Massimo Da Rin

Hall of Fame
 Scudetti: 1986/1987 e 1988/1989
 Federation Cup: 1995

Notable players

Curiosity
Delitto a Porta Romana, a 1980 movie by Bruno Corbucci, was set in Milan and a hockey game scene was shot at PalAlbani of Varese.

External links
 Official website
 Old Website
 Italian Winter Games Federation, Hockey 

Ice hockey teams in Italy
Alpenliga teams
Ice hockey clubs established in 1977
Sport in Varese
1977 establishments in Italy